Adelelmus (died c. 1100), also known as Aleaunie and Lesmes, was a French-born Benedictine monk venerated as a saint in the Roman Catholic Church.

Life
Born in Loudun, Poitou, Adelelmus joined the military at a young age. During a pilgrimage to Rome he met Robert de Turlande, founder of the abbey of La Chaise-Dieu, and left the military life for the Benedictine order.

Queen Constance of Burgundy of Castile was impressed with the reports of Adelelmus' holiness, and invited him to live in Burgos, Spain. She and King Alfonso VI founded a monastery in the city in 1079 on the condition he would be its abbot. He added a hospital and a church to the building soon after. He later used his military training to help Alfonso against the Moors.

After death, Adelelmus became the patron saint of the city of Burgos in Spain. His remains lie in the Iglesia de San Lesmes Abad

Adelelmus' feast day is kept on 30 January; it is no longer observed in the General Roman Calendar.

References

External links
Patron Saints Index

11th-century births
1100s deaths
Year of birth unknown
Year of death uncertain
People from Loudun
French Benedictines
Benedictine abbots
Benedictine saints
French Roman Catholic saints
French Christian monks
Spanish Roman Catholic saints
10th-century Christian saints
11th-century Christian saints